Stavola Brothers Racing was a NASCAR racing team, owned by Bill and Mickey Stavola, and operating NASCAR Winston Cup team from 1984 through 1998. The team won the 1988 Daytona 500 with Bobby Allison behind the wheel of the No. 12 Miller High Life Buick. Other victories include the 1987 Pepsi 400 with Allison, and the 1986 Talladega 500 with Bobby Hillin Jr.

In 1989 Dick Trickle was named NASCAR Rookie of the Year while driving for the team. Bobby Hillin drove the Snickers in 1990. Rick Wilson drove for the team in 1991 with sponsorship from Snickers, and the team switched to a Ford Thunderbird after Buick pulled out of NASCAR. Wilson was released after the 1992 Daytona 500 and Dick Trickle returned to drive for the remainder of the season. Sterling Marlin drove for the team in 1993 with new sponsorship from Raybestos, finishing second at the Pepsi 400 in July. Jeff Burton replaced Marlin the following year, and won Rookie Of The Year honors with one top-five finish; he drove the car again in 1995 before departing for Roush Racing.

In 1996 Hut Stricklin was hired to drive with Circuit City replacing Raybestos, which had become an associate sponsor for Robert Yates Racing. Stricklin finished second at the Mountain Dew Southern 500 in September. In 1998 the team switched to a Chevrolet Monte Carlo. Stricklin was released in May, after failing to qualify for 5 of the season's first 11 races, and Circuit City left to become an associate sponsor for Joe Gibbs Racing and driver Bobby Labonte. During a five-race partnership with Buckshot Racing, Buckshot Jones finished eighth during the MBNA Platinum 400. Morgan Shepherd drove the team's final race on November 8, 1998 at Atlanta Motor Speedway during the NAPA 500 in a Nokia/Kendall Motor Oil-sponsored car.

Results

Primary Car Results

Secondary Car Results

Stavola Labonte Racing 
Bill Stavola and Terry Labonte announced plans in 2009 to field cars in Sprint Cup in 2010 with Labonte driving initially. It was reported that they would attempt 3 races: Richmond, Charlotte and Texas, in the No. 10 Chevy. Cars and engines were supplied by Richard Childress Racing with sponsorship from Gander Mountain. The team attempted but failed to qualify at Richmond with Terry Labonte as driver after Terry's little brother Bobby Labonte needed the champions provisional. Terry and Gander Mountain would move to Prism Motorsports' 55 car for the race. On October 11, 2010 the team announced that Bobby Labonte would drive for the team at Charlotte and Texas, where the team finished 22nd and 30th respectively. Though Terry hoped to secure enough sponsorship to run 15 races the following season, the money never materialized and the team became dormant by the conclusion of 2010.

References

External links
Team Statistics
Website

American auto racing teams
Defunct NASCAR teams
Auto racing teams established in 1983
Auto racing teams disestablished in 1999